Robert Rive was a 19th-century photographer who was born in Great Britain but developed most of his work in Italy.  
After several years working in this country he changed his name to Roberto Rive.
The main collections of his work are the photos from Pompei and Rome in the 1860s and 1870s.
Rive exhibited at the "10th Annual Exhibition of the Photographie".

Photography
Robert Rive worked as a topographical and portrait photographer from the beginning of the 1860s until 1889 in Naples. In 1867, he took part at the Exposition Universelle of Paris. His studio produced views and stereographs of many Italian cities.
He took photographs of monuments of Naples, Pompei, Sorrento, Capri, Amalfi and  monuments of Sicily. He also took photographs of cities such as Florence, Pisa, Siena, Rome and Genoa. He held studios in Naples, Palazzo Serracapriola, Palazzo Lieti.

"Giorgio Sommer and Robert Rive began a systematic census of the monuments and daily life, in an amazing collection that provided information on Campania and Sicily" 

He also patented a photosensitive paper used in Southern Italy.

Gallery

Artwork Holders
J. Paul Getty Museum
Musée d'Orsay
Museo di Roma

References

External links

Art and Architecture images
Images of Pompei
Getty Museum record

British emigrants to Italy
Italian photographers
Year of death missing
Year of birth missing
19th-century British photographers